Totally Religious is the fourth release and third LP by The Screaming Blue Messiahs and (as of 2016) their last studio album. The album was co-produced by previous Screaming Blue Messiahs producer Howard Gray and Rob Stevens.

Reviews
The album has a 3/5 star rating on All Music. John Duggan wrote: "The final chunk of squalling guitar rant from the Screaming Blue Messiahs doesn't reach the relentless highs of Bikini Red, but it's pure mania nonetheless, and a sure shot for those who lapped up the first two waxings. The titles alone ("All Gassed Up" and "Four Engines Burning [Over the USA]") clue you in that this is no mellow fest."

Track listing

Personnel
The Screaming Blue Messiahs
Bill Carter - lead vocals, lead guitar
Chris Thompson - bass guitar, backing vocals
Kenny Harris - drums
Technical
Producer - Howard Gray
Producer – Rob Stevens

References

1989 albums
The Screaming Blue Messiahs albums
Elektra Records albums